Bradley Vincent (born 30 November 1991) is a South African-Mauritian competitive swimmer. He competed at the 2016 Summer Olympics in Rio de Janeiro, in the men's 100 metre freestyle. 
He starts at the Swimming World Cup 2017 and broke his own record (22,82) about 50m Freestyle.

In October 2022, he was handed a 3-year ban by the Mauritian Olympic Committee for misconduct during the Commonwealth Games 2022 in Birmingham.

References

External links

1991 births
Living people
Mauritian male freestyle swimmers
South African male freestyle swimmers
Olympic swimmers of Mauritius
Swimmers at the 2016 Summer Olympics
Commonwealth Games competitors for Mauritius
Swimmers at the 2014 Commonwealth Games
Place of birth missing (living people)
Swimmers at the 2018 Commonwealth Games
Swimmers at the 2022 Commonwealth Games
Swimmers at the 2015 African Games
African Games competitors for Mauritius
Sportspeople from Cape Town
White South African people
South African emigrants to Mauritius